The 194th New York State Legislature, consisting of the New York State Senate and the New York State Assembly, met from January 3, 2001, to December 31, 2002, during the seventh and eighth years of George Pataki's governorship, in Albany.

State Senate

Senators
The asterisk (*) denotes members of the previous Legislature who continued in office as members of this Legislature.

Note: For brevity, the chairmanships omit the words "...the Committee on (the)..."

Employees
 Secretary:

State Assembly

Assembly members
The asterisk (*) denotes members of the previous Legislature who continued in office as members of this Legislature.

Note: For brevity, the chairmanships omit the words "...the Committee on (the)..."

Employees
 Clerk: ?

References

Sources
 Senate election results at NYS Board of Elections
 Assembly election results at NYS Board of Elections

194
2001 politics in New York (state)
2002 politics in New York (state)
2001 U.S. legislative sessions
2002 U.S. legislative sessions